Chama is an unincorporated community and U.S. Post Office in Costilla County, Colorado, United States.  The ZIP Code of the Chama Post Office is 81126.

History
Chama is located in the Rio Culebra valley which is part of the Sangre de Cristo Land Grant was awarded to the family of Carlos Beaubien in 1843 by the government of New Mexico. The town of Chama was established by settlers from Chamita, New Mexico,  in 1860.  The Chama Post Office opened on May 3, 1907. The Chama school was taken down between the years of 1999 and 2001.

Description
Most of Chama's houses are made of adobe. Many of them are very old. There are also a lot of rocks and "chamiso" sagebrush in Chama. The community lies at the foot of the Culebra Ranch.

Geography
Chama is located at  (37.162916,-105.375023).

See also

Outline of Colorado
Index of Colorado-related articles
State of Colorado
Colorado cities and towns
Colorado counties
Costilla County, Colorado
Old Spanish National Historic Trail
San Luis Valley

References

External links

Unincorporated communities in Costilla County, Colorado
Unincorporated communities in Colorado